Hyadaphis is a genus of aphids in the family Aphididae. There are about 19 described species in Hyadaphis.

Species
These 19 species belong to the genus Hyadaphis:

 Hyadaphis agabiformis (Nevsky, 1928)
 Hyadaphis albus (Monzen, 1929)
 Hyadaphis anethi Nieto Nafría, Pérez Hidalgo & P.A.Brown, 2016
 Hyadaphis bicincta Börner, 1942
 Hyadaphis bupleuri Börner, 1939
 Hyadaphis bupleuriphila Barjadze & Özdemir, 2018
 Hyadaphis coerulescens
 Hyadaphis coriandri (Das, B.C., 1918) (coriander aphid)
 Hyadaphis ferganica
 Hyadaphis foeniculi (Passerini, 1860) (fenel aphid)
 Hyadaphis galaganiae
 Hyadaphis haplophylli Kadyrbekov, 2005
 Hyadaphis levantina Nieto Nafría, Pérez Hidalgo & P.A.Brown, 2016
 Hyadaphis mongolica Szelegiewicz, 1969
 Hyadaphis parva Nieto Nafría, Pérez Hidalgo & P.A.Brown, 2016
 Hyadaphis passerinii (Del Guercio, 1911)
 Hyadaphis polonica Szelegiewicz, 1959
 Hyadaphis tataricae (Aizenberg) (honeysuckle aphid)
 Hyadaphis veratri Shinji, 1942

References

Further reading

 
 

Sternorrhyncha genera
Macrosiphini